Poljče is a village near Begunje in the Municipality of Radovljica in the Upper Carniola region of Slovenia.

References

External links

Poljče at Geopedia

Populated places in the Municipality of Radovljica